Otama  may refer to:
HMAS Otama, formerly a submarine of the Royal Australian Navy
Otama, Fukushima, a village in Japan
Otama Beach on New Zealand's Coromandel Peninsula